Gournadi is a town and paurashava situated in the Barisal district, south-central Bangladesh.

See also 
 Gournadi Upazila

References 

Populated places in Barisal District